= Saltire Scholarship =

Saltire Scholarship is a scholarship offered by Government of Scotland for study in Scotland for period of one year.

== Eligible countries ==
Following are eligible countries:

- Canada
- China
- India
- Japan
- Pakistan
- United States
